Abureni is a Central Delta language of Nigeria.

References

Languages of Nigeria
Central Delta languages